James Dennison Sebring  (March 22, 1882–December 22, 1909), was a professional baseball player who played outfield from 1902 to 1909. He attended college at Bucknell University. He played in the 1903 World Series with the Pittsburgh Pirates and was the first player in World Series history to hit a home run. He died of Bright's disease in 1909.

In 363 games over 5 seasons, Sebring compiled a .261 batting average (368-for-1411) with 178 runs, 6 home runs and 168 RBIs. In the 1903 World Series, he batted .333 (10-for-30) with 3 runs, 1 home run and 4 RBI. The home run was the first one in World Series history.

See also
 List of baseball players who died during their careers

References

External links

1882 births
1909 deaths
Major League Baseball outfielders
Brooklyn Superbas players
Pittsburgh Pirates players
Cincinnati Reds players
Washington Senators (1901–1960) players
Baseball players from Pennsylvania
Wilmington Giants players
Worcester Hustlers players
Williamsport Millionaires players
Wilmington Peaches players
Harrisburg Senators players
Deaths from nephritis